George Thomas Mills (12 September 1923 – 15 September 1983) was an English cricketer who played two first-class matches for Worcestershire in 1953. He claimed four dismissals on debut against Cambridge University at Fenner's in May,
and a further five a month later against Middlesex at Worcester,
but these two matches proved to be the sum of his first-class career.

Notes

References
George Mills from CricketArchive
Lists of matches and detailed statistics from CricketArchive

English cricketers
Worcestershire cricketers
1923 births
1983 deaths
Sportspeople from Redditch